Alveocystis is a genus in the phylum Apicomplexa. Species in this genus infect worms of the family Priapuloidea and molluscs. This genus has been poorly studied and little is known about it.

History

This genus was created by Bel'tenev in 1980.

The recognised first species of this genus was Alveocystis macrocoronata by Lüling in 1942.

Taxonomy

Four species are recognised in this genus. Morphologically they resemble members of the genus Pfeifferinella.

Description

The oocysts have no sporocysts. A distinct convex micropyle is usually present at one end of the oocyst. Within each oocyst there are 8 or more free sporozoites and a large oocyst residuum.

References

Apicomplexa genera